Michelena is a town in Táchira state, Venezuela. It was founded in 1849 by José Amando Pérez. It has a population of 22.500.

Notable people
Ilich Ramírez Sánchez, also known as Carlos the Jackal, currently serving life sentence in France for killing three people, was born here.
Marcos Pérez Jiménez, a former president of Venezuela, was born there.

Populated places in Táchira
Populated places established in 1849
1849 establishments in Venezuela